Ted Roop is a Canadian radio and media personality, and one of the presenters of Roop, Wix and Meg In The Morning, which has been broadcasting on 104.1 The Dock (CICZ-FM) since March 3, 2008. Roop is also Director of Programming for The Dock's parent company, Larche Communications, which has three other broadcasting licenses.

Childhood and early life
Roop began working as a child actor at the age of eight, appearing in more than 30 television and radio commercials, including Pizza Hut, Wrangler Jeans, and McCain French Fries. He also voiced several radio commercials for companies such as Esso and Big Brothers, and worked on several movies, including The Last Season, Night Friend and an episode of the television series Friday The 13th.

Roop's family moved from the west end of Toronto to the Waterdown area when he was beginning high school. He spent his formative years at Waterdown District High School. It was through a high school co-operative education program that he developed his interest in radio, completing a placement at the Mohawk College Radio Station CIOI-FM in his fourth year of high school.

Radio career
After graduating High School, Roop began a two-year radio broadcasting program at Fanshawe College in the fall of 1996. He graduated from the program in the spring of 1998 and started working for BEA-VER Communications, on CKSY FM95 CKSY-FM on March 2, 1998. He started as the Swing Announcer at CKSY-FM. At the time, BEA-VER Communications owned and operated CKSY-FM and CFCO, its AM Oldies sister station, from their Chatham, Kent studios, but had an application in progress to the CRTC for a third FM station. When this application was successful, the company opened CKUE-FM in November 1999, with Roop as the Afternoon Drive host, and moving to the morning show in January 2001.

In June 2002, Roop was hired to work as the Afternoon Drive host in Midland, Ontario on CICZ-FM. At the time, CICZ-FM was a country music station, KICX 104 FM. In 2004 Larche Communications opened CIKZ-FM in Kitchener—Waterloo. At that time, the KICX 104 FM Program Director was moved to CIKZ-FM to launch the station, at which point Roop was moved to the Morning Show and given the program director title.

Roop remained Morning Show host/Program Director on KICX 104 FM until March 2008. During his time in that position, he was named the Canadian Country Music Association's Music Director Of The Year in 2007, and won the Canadian Country Music Association's Personality Of The Year Award in 2006 and 2007 with his co-host Carey Moran.

In March 2008, Larche Communications moved its country format to its newly acquired Orillia frequency at CICX-FM, and launched a brand new Classic Rock station on CICZ-FM, now known as 104.1 THE DOCK. Roop said goodbye to his longtime co-host Carey Moran, and moved to Classic Rock, remaining on the 104.1 frequency to launch a new morning show with Meg Whitton and Brian Wicks, both of whom had moved to Midland and decided to stay with Larche Communications after the sale of CIKZ. Shortly after the launch of the Dock, Roop was named Director of Programming for Larche Communications. He now oversees the programming, with the help of his KICX PD's Jack Latimer and Trinette Atkinson, DOCK Midland APD Josh Duncan, on CICZ-FM, CICX-FM, CICS-FM and Don Vail at CJOS-FM in Owen Sound.

Canadian Country Spotlight
Roop also hosts a weekly, one-hour country music spotlight program called Canadian Country Spotlight, which highlights Canadian country music. It airs weekly on country music radio stations across Canada. The show launched on Labour Day Weekend 2011, and has since featured Jason McCoy, George Canyon, Gord Bamford, Paul Brandt and various other well-known figures from Canadian Country.

Personal life
Roop lives with his wife and two children in Orillia, Ontario.

References

 Canadian Country Spotlight
 104.1 The DOCK

External links

 Ted Roop's Official Web Site at TedRoop.com
 Official Web Site of The Canadian Country Spotlight at canadiancountryspotlight.com
 

1977 births
Canadian male film actors
Canadian radio personalities
Fanshawe College alumni
Living people
Male actors from Ontario
People from Orillia